Mudmen are a Canadian Celtic rock band. They are best known for their singles "5 O'Clock", "Saturday", and "Drink and Fight" as well as their covers of Spirit of the West's "Home for a Rest" and AC/DC's "It's a Long Way to the Top (If You Wanna Rock 'n' Roll)".

History 
The Mudmen formed in Alvinston/Petrolia in 1998. The original band members were vocalist Zoy  Nicoles, guitarist Lonny Knapp, bassist Tommy Skilton, drummer Ryan McCaffrey and bagpipe-playing brothers Robby and Sandy Campbell who were the founding members, who had previously been signed with the EMI label under the name The Campbell Brothers.

In 2001 the Mudmen performed at the Snow Jam festival in Halifax. That year the band released a self-titled studio album; a second album, Overrated, was released in 2003. The band then toured across Canada with Bif Naked, and played at many festivals, including Edgefest. 

The Mudmen released 9  studio albums—Mudmen (2001), Overrated (2003), Defending The Kingdom (2005), The High Road (2009), Another Day (2010), Donegal Danny (2012), "Where I Came From" (2013),  "Train" (2015), and "Old Plaid Shirt (2016).

The band's music has been featured in popular culture—their single "Lost", from their self-titled debut, was featured in a promotional video for the NBC television show The Black Donnelly's, and their single "Animal" was featured in the soundtracks of the video games Burnout 3: Takedown, MX vs. ATV Unleashed HBO'S Shameless . The Campbell Brothers "founding members" appear on the Bob and Doug's 24 anniversary special and have music featured on Don Cherry's hockey videos 9,19,2024,27,29 and coach's corner Dale Hunter Tribute. The Mudmen  wrote and recorded the theme entrance music for WWE Wrestlers The Highlanders, reached #19 on the Edge radio top 20 countdown with 6 music videos on Much Music . Career highlights include meeting & performing for the Queen, performing at the 84 Edmonton oilers Stanley Cup re-union, The Oilers/Flames home opening ceremonies, 7 Grey Cups, 3 memorial Cups, 12 Canada's Walk of Fame Ceremonies,2 Special Olympic opening televised ceremonies opening up for legendary bands ZZ Top & The Guess Who.Mudmen and the Campbell Brothers have performed over 3000 shows to date.

The Mudmen are continuing to perform together. The Brantford Blast  and Brantford Red Sox are currently using the Mudmen's song "Go team Go" as their entrance  theme. Mudmen will celebrate their 25th Anniversary in 2023 For more info on mudmen visit www.mudmen.ca

Name and background
The band's name comes from the Campbell Brothers "founding members" occupation prior to forming the band. They were mixing mortar and carrying bricks for bricklayers.

The band's music is influenced by traditional Scottish music, as well as hard rock groups such as AC/DC. Mudmen have opened for many well-known bands, including ZZ Top, Tool, Dropkick Murphys and Bowling for Soup, as well as fellow Canadians Nickelback, Sum 41 and The Guess Who.

Band members
Sandy Campbell - Bagpipes, Backup Vocals
Robby Campbell - Bagpipes
Colin Amey - Lead singer, Guitar
Jordon Brosseau - Bass Guitar, Backup Vocals
Andy Gingerich - Drums, Percussion 
Alex Showdra - Electric Guitar, Banjo, Mandolin, Backup Vocals, Live Sound

Current band members 

Robby Campbell - Bagpipes
Sandy Campbell - Bagpipes
Colin Amey-Lead Singer, Acoustic Guitar
Jordon Brosseau - Bass Guitar
Andy Gingerich - Drums, Percussion
Alex Showdra - Electric Guitar, Banjo, Mandolin, Backup Vocals, Live Sound

Former band members
Dan Westenenk - Bass Guitar 
Jeremy Burton - Drums 
Steve Gore - Vocals and Guitar
Zois (ZOY) Nicoles - Lead Vocals
Lonny Knapp - Guitar
Tommy Skilton - Bass Guitar
Ryan McCaffrey - Drums
Alex Maletich-Guitar, Banjo & Mandolin 
Troy Spinney-Bass Guitar
Matt Coburn-Guitar

Discography
Mudmen (2001, EMI)
Overrated (2003 Sextent/EMI)
Defending the Kingdom (2006 Mudpiper Records)
The High Road  (2009 Mudpiper Records)
Another Day (2010, Mudpiper Records)
Donegal Danny (2012, Mudpiper Records)
Where I Came From (2013, Mudpiper Records)
On a Train (2015, Mudpiper Records)
Old Plaid Shirt (2016, Mudpiper Records)
 Best of Mudmen (2021,Mudpiper Records)
 Farmers Tan (2022,Mudpiper  Records)

References

External links
Mudmen Official website
Mudmen at MuchMusic
 Mudmen Official Facebook page

Musical groups established in 1998
Musical groups from Ontario
Canadian folk rock groups
Celtic rock groups
Celtic punk groups
Canadian punk rock groups
EMI Records artists
1998 establishments in Ontario